Balanche is a surname. Notable people with the surname include:

 Camille Balanche (born 1990), Swiss cyclist
 Fabrice Balanche (born 1969), French geographer
 Gérard Balanche (born 1964), Swiss ski jumper